Björkhagen (The Birch Pasture) is a district in Skarpnäck borough, Stockholm, Sweden. Björkhagen has 5,695 inhabitants as of December 31, 2007.

The Stockholm metro station Björkhagen is an elevated station which is served by the green line 17.

References

Districts of Stockholm